The 2018 Africa Beach Soccer Cup of Nations was the third edition of the Africa Beach Soccer Cup of Nations (BSAFCON), the premier beach soccer championship in Africa contested by men's national teams who are members of the Confederation of African Football (CAF). Originally organised by Beach Soccer Worldwide (BSWW) under the title FIFA Beach Soccer World Cup CAF qualifier (informally known as CAF Beach Soccer Championship), in 2015, CAF became organisers and began using the BSAFCON title to which the competition was officially renamed the next year. Overall, this was the 9th edition of the event.

The tournament was played in Sharm El Sheikh, Egypt; the North African country was awarded the hosting rights as they were the only nation to express interest by the deadline. The finals were held from 8–14 December. Qualification took place between 7–23 September. 

The event also acted as the qualification route for African teams to the 2019 FIFA Beach Soccer World Cup in Paraguay; the winners and runners-up qualify.

Senegal were the defending champions and successfully defended their title, after defeating Nigeria 6–1 in the final to secure their 5th title.

Qualification

The 2018 Africa Beach Soccer Cup of Nations qualifying rounds determine the eight teams that will compete in the final tournament in December.

The fixtures were approved by CAF on 11 June.

Qualification ties are played on a home-and-away, two-legged basis. If the sides are level on aggregate after the second leg, the away goals rule is applied, and if still level, the tie proceeds directly to a penalty shoot-out (no extra time is played).

Hosts of the finals, Egypt, along with the champions and runners up of the last edition, Senegal and Nigeria respectively, received byes in qualifying; ten other nations contested five qualification berths.

Ghana were due to play but failed to meet participation criteria by the May 31 entry deadline.

Entrants

Note: The numbers in parentheses show the African ranking of the teams at the time of the qualification round (out of 20 nations).

Matches

Summary
The first legs were scheduled for 7–9 September, and the second legs were scheduled for 21–23 September 2018.

The winners of each tie qualified for the finals.

|}
Bold: Tie winners; qualified for finals.

Details

Ivory Coast won 7–5 on aggregate.

Libya won on walkover after Kenya withdrew.

Tanzania won on walkover after South Africa withdrew.

Morocco won on walkover after Sudan withdrew.

Madagascar won 10–9 on aggregate.

Qualified teams
The following eight teams qualified for the final tournament:

Draw
The draw for the final tournament was held on 28 October 2018 at the CAF Headquarters in Cairo, Egypt. The eight teams were drawn into two groups of four.

Initially, two teams were automatically assigned to the groups:

to Group A: as the hosts, 
to Group B: as the champions of the last edition, 

The remaining six teams were split into two pots: one of two and one of four; the highest seeds were placed in Pot 1 and the lowest seeds were placed in Pot 2. The teams were seeded based on their results in the 2016 Africa Beach Soccer Cup of Nations. From Pot 1, one team was drawn into Group A and the other team was drawn into Group B; from Pot 2, two teams were drawn into Group A and two teams were drawn into Group B.

Referees
The following 21 referees will officiate the tournament:

 Innocent Desire Adjoumani
 Wonan Dominique Sidoine Toppe
 Tsaralaza Maolidy
 Louis Siave
 Reetesh Loll
 Olawale Adeolu Fawole
 Olayanka Olajide
 Sani Mohammed 
 Aly Deme
 Mbokh Beye
 Oumar Sagna
 Youssouph Signate
 Fadul Abdelmajeed Adam
 Hassan Mohamed Eltoum
 Nagi Ali Doka
 Yasir Allahgabu Abdelrahman Tootoo
 Hamdi Bchir
 Med El Habib Hiba
 Ivan Kintu
 Muhammad Ssenteza
 Shafic Mugerwa

Venue

One venue was used in the city of Sharm El Sheikh.
All matches took place at a purpose built arena at Laguna Vista Beach Resort, known as the Laguna Vista Beach Soccer Stadium, with a capacity of 1,200.

Squads

Each squad can contain a maximum of 12 players.

Group stage
Each team earns three points for a win in regulation time, two points for a win in extra time, one point for a win in a penalty shoot-out, and no points for a defeat. The top two teams from each group advance to the semi-finals.

All times are local, EET (UTC+2).

Group A

Group B

Placement stage (5th–8th place)

Bracket (5th–8th place)

Fifth place semi-finals

Seventh place match

Fifth place match

Knockout stage

Bracket (1st–4th place)

Semi-finals
Winners qualify for 2019 FIFA Beach Soccer World Cup.

Third place match

Final

Goalscorers

Final ranking

Qualified teams for FIFA Beach Soccer World Cup
The following two teams from CAF qualify for the 2019 FIFA Beach Soccer World Cup.

1 Bold indicates champions for that year. Italic indicates hosts for that year.

References

External links
Beach Soccer Africa Cup Of Nations , Egypt 2018, at CAFonline.com
3rd Edition Of Beach Soccer AFCON Egypt 2018 (qualifiers), at CAFonline.com
CAF Beach Soccer Africa Cup of Nations - Egypt, at Beach Soccer Worldwide
African Cup 2018, at Beach Soccer Russia (in Russian)

Beach Soccer Championship
Caf
International association football competitions hosted by Egypt
2018
2018 in beach soccer
Beach Soccer Cup of Nations